Chaenotheca cinerea is a species of pin lichen in the family Coniocybaceae. It was first described in 1800 by Christiaan Hendrik Persoon as Calicium cinereum. Leif Tibell transferred it to the genus Chaenotheca in 1987.

References

Pezizomycotina
Lichen species
Lichens described in 1800
Lichens of Europe
Taxa named by Christiaan Hendrik Persoon